Letti sbagliati is a 1965 Italian comedy film directed by Steno starring the comic duo Franco and Ciccio.

Cast
Franco Franchi	... 	(segment "La seconda moglie")
Ciccio Ingrassia	... 	(segment "La seconda moglie")
Lando Buzzanca	... 	(segment "Il complicato")
Aldo Giuffrè	... 	(segment "Il complicato")
Pietro Tordi	... 	(segment "Il complicato")
Margaret Lee	... 	(segment "00-Sexy, missione bionda platino")
Raimondo Vianello	... 	(segment "00-Sexy, missione bionda platino")
Fulvia Franco	... 	(segment "00-Sexy, missione bionda platino")
Piero Morgia	... 	(segment "00-Sexy, missione bionda platino")
Carlo Giuffrè	... 	(segment "Quel porco di Maurizio")
Beba Lončar	... 	(segment "Quel porco di Maurizio")
Aldo Puglisi	... 	(segment "Quel porco di Maurizio")
Tecla Scarano	... 	(segment "Quel porco di Maurizio")
Ingeborg Schöner	... 	(segment "Il complicato")

External links
 

1965 films
1960s Italian-language films
1965 comedy films
Films directed by Stefano Vanzina
Films scored by Carlo Rustichelli
Italian comedy films
Films set in Rome
Films shot in Rome
1960s Italian films